Only Yazoo is a greatest hits compilation album released by British synthpop duo Yazoo in 1999.

The collection includes the best bits of their two studio albums - Upstairs at Eric's and You and Me Both as well as non-album tracks like "State Farm". The album also included a number of new remixes that were featured on re-issued singles.

The album's title is a play on their biggest single, "Only You". In the US and Canada, however, where the band were known as Yaz, the album was called The Best Of, and was released by Reprise Records, like Sire, also owned by Warner Music Group.

Track listing

CD : Mute / CD Mutel 6 (UK)
 "Only You" – 3:12
 "Ode to Boy" – 3:38
 "Nobody's Diary" – 4:31
 "Midnight" – 4:20
 "Goodbye 70's" – 2:33
 "Anyone" – 3:25
 "Don't Go" – 3:06
 "Mr Blue" – 3:26
 "Tuesday" – 3:19
 "Winter Kills" – 4:03
 "State Farm" – 3:35
 "Situation" (US 12" Mix) – 5:46
 "Don't Go" (Todd Terry Freeze Mix) – 6:12
 "Situation" (Club 69 Future Funk Mix) – 8:48
 "Only You" (1999 Version) – 2:53

References

External links
Official Yazoo page
Alison Moyet's official website

1999 greatest hits albums
Yazoo (band) albums
Albums produced by Eric Radcliffe
Mute Records compilation albums
Albums produced by Vince Clarke

sv:You And Me Both